IROC III was the third year of IROC competition, which took place over three weekends in 1975 and 1976. It saw the use of the Chevrolet Camaro in all races, and the schedule was held over in its entirety from IROC II. A. J. Foyt won the championship and $50,000 without winning a race.

The roster of drivers and final points standings were as follows;

Race results

Michigan International Speedway, Race One

 David Pearson
 Bobby Allison
 A. J. Foyt
 Benny Parsons
 Emerson Fittipaldi
 Richard Petty
 Brian Redman
 Al Unser
 Mario Andretti
 Jody Scheckter
 James Hunt
 Bobby Unser

Riverside International Raceway, Race Two

 Bobby Unser
 A. J. Foyt
 Mario Andretti
 Emerson Fittipaldi
 Benny Parsons
 Richard Petty
 Jody Scheckter
 Brian Redman
 Al Unser
 David Pearson
 Bobby Allison
 James Hunt

Riverside International Raceway, Race Three

 Bobby Allison
 Al Unser
 A. J. Foyt
 Mario Andretti
 Bobby Unser
 James Hunt
 Brian Redman
 David Pearson
 Benny Parsons
 Jody Scheckter
 Richard Petty
 Emerson Fittipaldi

Daytona International Speedway, Race Four

 Benny Parsons
 A. J. Foyt
 Mario Andretti
 David Pearson
 Al Unser
 Emerson Fittipaldi
 Bobby Allison
 Bobby Unser
 Brian Redman

References

External links
IROC III History - IROC Website

International Race of Champions 
1976 in American motorsport
1975 in American motorsport